DMRC may refer to:

 Delhi Metro Rail Corporation
 Desert Medicine Research Centre
 DMRC Headley Court, a United Kingdom Ministry of Defence facility in Headley, Surrey, England